The eight is a rowing event held at the Summer Olympics. The event was first held for men at the second modern Olympics in 1900, and has been held at every Games since. The women's event was added when women's rowing was added to the Olympic programme in 1976, and has been held at every Games since 1996, it is the only Olympic rowing event that uses a coxswain.

Medalists

Men

Medalists by country

Women

Medalists by country

References

Eight